The Moldy Peaches: Fer the Kids/ Live 1999 contains two separate albums and is available in both cassette and CD formats.  The artwork proclaims, "It's like two for the price of one!" Many songs on this album were later released with different titles.  According to Moldy Peach Kimya Dawson, there are about 80 copies in existence.

A later CD-R version, called "Ferever" (Average Cabbage #3), combined this release with the complete contents of the earlier X-Ray Vision EP.

Side A
 "Nothing Came Out"
 "Bleeding Heart"
 "Greyhound"
 "Lucky Number Nine"
 "What Went Wrong"
 "D2 Boyfriend"
 "Secret Tongues"
 "Shame"
 "Wake Up"
 "These Burgers" 
 "I Forgot"
 "Lazy Confessions"
 "It's Hard"
 "Lucky Charms"

Side B
 "What Went Wrong"
 "Lazy Confessions"
 "D2 Boyfriend"
 "Crazy Burgers"
 "Where Is Mankind?"
 "Big Girls Don't Cry"
 "Goodbye Song"
 "Little Bunny Foo Foo"
 "Greyhound Bus"
 "Shame"
 "Secret Tongues"
 "Lucky No. Nine"
 "Bleeding Heart"
 "Nothing Came Out"

1999 albums
The Moldy Peaches albums
1999 live albums